Ostryocarpus is genus  of flowering plants in the legume family, Fabaceae. It belongs to the subfamily Faboideae. The name comes from ostryo- (Gk.: shell) and carpos (Gk.: fruit), referring to the shell-like pods.

The first specimens were collected by Theodore Vogel in 1851 on the Niger Expedition to West Africa.  It was described by Sir Joseph Hooker.  It is related to the genus Lonchocarpus and is distinguished from it by its diadelphous stamens and shell-like pod.

Description
Ostryocarpus has glabrous 
exstipellate stamens, short stalked flowers on special short branchlets, hooked wings and keel petals and a short 2-3 ovuled gynoecium surrounded at the base by a fimbriate disk which is usually adnate to the base of the calyx.

Distribution and Habitat
Ostryocarpus is found in the tropical rainforests  and seasonally dry forests of the Guineo-Congolan region of tropical West Africa. They grow as lianas or scandent shrubs. and are often in riparian and mangrove habitats.

Uses
They are used as fish poisons and for fish nets (fibre) and rope.

Species List
Ostryocarpus riparius Hook. f.

Ostryocarpus zenkerianus (Harms) Dunn

References

Millettieae
Fabaceae genera